Martín Gabriel Bogado (born 29 April 1998) is a Argentinian rugby union player who plays for the  in Super Rugby. His playing position is wing or fullback. He was named in the Highlanders squad for the 2023 Super Rugby Pacific season.

Bogado was a product of the Club Centro de Cazadores de Misiones club, before moving to Jockey Club Córdoba. He represented Olímpia Lions in the 2021 SLAR, before joining  for the 2022 edition. He joined  as a medical joker in late-2022, before the Highlanders announced his signing on a two-year deal in November 2022.

Bogado has represented Argentina XV on four occasions. He was also called up to the full Argentina squad for a training camp in October 2022.

References

External links
itsrugby.co.uk profile

1998 births
Argentine rugby union players
Living people
Rugby union wings
Rugby union fullbacks
Yacare XV players
Jaguares (Super Rugby) players
Aviron Bayonnais players
Highlanders (rugby union) players
Sportspeople from Misiones Province